Telba Zalkind Irony is a Brazilian statistician, operations researcher, and proponent of Bayesian statistics. She works at the Food and Drug Administration, where she was formerly chief of biostatistics at the Office of Device Evaluation and is now deputy directory of biostatistics and epidemiology at the Center for Biologics Evaluation and Research.

Irony was born in São Paulo, and studied physics and statistics at the University of São Paulo, earning both a bachelor's degree and master's degree there. She obtained her Ph.D. in industrial engineering and operations research in 1989 from the University of California, Berkeley with a dissertation Modeling, Information Extraction and Decision Making a Bayesian Approach to Some Engineering Problems supervised by Richard E. Barlow. Before joining the FDA, she was part of the operations research department at George Washington University.

In 2010, she became a Fellow of the American Statistical Association. In 2014, she won the Excellence in Analytical Science Award of the Food and Drug Administration "for spearheading innovative regulatory science studies, culminating in the release of novel guidance documents; supporting complex policy decision-making; and changing the submission review paradigm".

References

Year of birth missing (living people)
Living people
American statisticians
Brazilian statisticians
Women statisticians
University of São Paulo alumni
University of California, Berkeley alumni
George Washington University faculty
Fellows of the American Statistical Association